Refuge Island is a flat granite island, with an area of about 6 ha, in south-eastern Australia.  It is part of the Schouten Island Group, lying close to the eastern coast of Tasmania near the Freycinet Peninsula and is part of the Freycinet National Park.

History
Shore-based whaling activities were conducted on the island in the 1820s. George Meredity and William Maycock had rival whaling stations in 1829. The activity continued during the 1830 season.

Fauna
Recorded breeding seabird species are little penguin and short-tailed shearwater.  The spotted skink is present.

References

Islands of Tasmania
Protected areas of Tasmania
Whaling stations in Australia